This is a list of singles that charted in the top ten of the Billboard Hot 100, an all-genre singles chart, in 2015.

During 2015, Mark Ronson's "Uptown Funk" (featuring Bruno Mars) spent 31 weeks in the top 10, becoming the single with the longest run in the top 10 of 2015 and the second longest running top 10 single of all time. Taylor Swift received five top 10 hits during the year, all from her fifth studio album 1989. The Weeknd and Justin Bieber followed her with four, with Fetty Wap and Meghan Trainor receiving three.

Top-ten singles
Key
 – indicates single's top 10 entry was also its Hot 100 debut
 – indicates best performing song of the year
(#) - 2015 year-end top 10 single position and rank

2014 peaks

2016 peaks

Notes

The single re-entered the top ten on the week ending January 3, 2015.
The single re-entered the top ten on the week ending January 10, 2015.
The single re-entered the top ten on the week ending January 24, 2015.
The single re-entered the top ten on the week ending May 2, 2015.
The single re-entered the top ten on the week ending May 23, 2015.
The single re-entered the top ten on the week ending May 30, 2015.
The single re-entered the top ten on the week ending August 29, 2015.
The single re-entered the top ten on the week ending September 5, 2015.
The single re-entered the top ten on the week ending September 19, 2015.
The single re-entered the top ten on the week ending December 12, 2015.

See also
 2015 in American music
 List of Billboard Hot 100 number ones of 2015
 Billboard Year-End Hot 100 singles of 2015

References

External links
Billboard.com
Billboard.biz
The Billboard Hot 100

United States Hot 100 Top Ten Singles
2015